Irene Maria Quintanilha Coelho da Fonseca is a Portuguese-American applied mathematician, the Kavčić-Moura University Professor of Mathematics at Carnegie Mellon University, where she directs the Center for Nonlinear Analysis.

Professional career
Fonseca was born in Portugal, and did her undergraduate studies at the University of Lisbon. She earned a Ph.D. from the University of Minnesota in 1985, under the supervision of David Kinderlehrer, who later followed his student to CMU. She joined the CMU faculty after postdoctoral studies in Paris, France.

In 2011, Fonseca was elected president of the Society for Industrial and Applied Mathematics. She also served on the Mathematical Sciences jury for the Infosys Prize in 2014 and 2015.

Books
Fonseca is the co-author of:
Degree Theory in Analysis and Applications (with Wilfrid Gangbo, Oxford University Press, 1995)
Modern Methods in the Calculus of Variations: LP Spaces (with Giovanni Leoni, Springer Verlag, 2007)

Awards and honors
Fonseca is a knight of the Order of Saint James of the Sword.
In 2009, Fonseca was elected as a fellow of SIAM "for contributions to nonlinear partial differential equations and the calculus of variations". In 2012 she became a fellow of the American Mathematical Society.

References

Year of birth missing (living people)
Living people
20th-century American mathematicians
21st-century American mathematicians
20th-century Portuguese mathematicians
American women mathematicians
University of Lisbon alumni
University of Minnesota alumni
Carnegie Mellon University faculty
Fellows of the American Mathematical Society
Fellows of the Society for Industrial and Applied Mathematics
Knights of the Order of Saint James of the Sword
Presidents of the Society for Industrial and Applied Mathematics
Variational analysts
20th-century women mathematicians
21st-century women mathematicians
21st-century American women